Climate Live  is a series of international concerts hosted every year in over 40+ countries. The concert series was developed by Fridays for Future organisers. Climate Live launched on April 24 with performances by notable artists including Declan McKenna, Milky Chance, Helen Sjöholm, Lia Pappas-Kemps, Lina Mirai, and Oscar Stembridge, as well as supporting messages from Any Gabrielly and Gretchen.

Development 
The concerts were announced on 20 November 2020 by a group of activists and artists including Activist Greta Thunberg, Artists Glass Animals, Sam Fender, Declan McKenna, Groove Armada, Thomas Headon, Sundara Karma, The Wombats, and Ida Young, as well as Environmental Filmmaker Jack Harries and supermodel Eunice Olumide. Christiana Figueres, former executive secretary of the UNFCCC, also gave her support for the project, saying "There is no doubt that young people, informed by science, have brought the climate crisis to the attention of leaders from all sectors. It is now our generation's responsibility to protect what we love from the damages of climate change by following up on promises with the necessary actions in this decade, to fulfil the goals of the Paris Agreement."

Climate Live was organised by youth climate activists in conjunction with music and event professionals.

20-year-old Frances Fox, founder of Climate Live, said that the inspiration for Climate Live came in Spring 2019 from "an interview in which Brian May said there should be a Live Aid for the climate crisis."

The organisers aimed to use "the universal language of music" to engage, educate and empower new audiences to pressure world leaders (political, economic, and cultural) to take action to combat the climate crisis, with a focus on COP26 conference where countries will renew their climate pledges.

Launch 
Climate Live officially launched on April 24, 2021, with concerts and actions in the United Kingdom, Uruguay, Brazil, Germany, Uganda, Canada, Mexico, The Netherlands, Colombia, Sweden, Portugal, Ireland, DRC, Spain, Japan, and Afghanistan. 

In the UK, Singer-songwriter Declan Mckenna performed on a barge in front of the Palace of Westminster in London. In an interview with Sky News prior to the event, he stated "What disaster are we waiting for? There's so much reason and so much cause to change the way we’re doing things right now and why wait? Why wait to act on this? We really are already seeing the impacts of climate change, of temperatures rising all around the world. We are already seeing the impact of pollution, the impact of all of this stuff for many years now – why wait? Why wait to do something massive?" source. Brazilian singer Any Gabrielly expressed that "The louder we scream, the more we'll be heard" in support of the actions in Brazil. Helen Sjöholm, a Swedish singer who performed in front of a projection on the Swedish Parliament declared that - "I support Climate Live and all the young - and older - who have taken up the fight for our planet."

References

External links

Music festivals established in 2021
Musical advocacy groups
2021 in music
2021 in the environment